Maurizia Barazzoni is a soprano born in 1955 in Bibbiano, Reggio Emilia, Italy.

She graduated from the Conservatorio Martini in Canto Lirico with full marks. She won the Festival Caccini Recitar Cantando contest. She has interpreted most of the Italian Baroque composers  and among many recordings is the complete madrigals and arias of Giulio Caccini. She is to be heard on the soundtrack of the 1996 film The Portrait of a Lady.

She is the author of Metodo di Canto Italiano dal 'Recitar cantando' a Rossini (Method of Italian Singing from 'Recitar cantando' to Rossini).

References 

People from Reggio Emilia
Italian operatic sopranos
1955 births
Living people